Lindsay Davenport was the defending champion and won in the final 7–5, 6–3 against Venus Williams.

Seeds
A champion seed is indicated in bold text while text in italics indicates the round in which that seed was eliminated. The top four seeds received a bye to the second round.

  Lindsay Davenport (champion)
  Venus Williams (final)
  Conchita Martínez (second round)
  Nathalie Tauziat (semifinals)
  Patty Schnyder (second round)
  Amanda Coetzer (quarterfinals)
  Mary Pierce (quarterfinals)
  Dominique Van Roost (quarterfinals)

Draw

Final

Section 1

Section 2

External links
 WTA tournament draws

Zurich Open
1998 WTA Tour